Múzquiz may refer to:

 Múzquiz Municipality, a municipality of Coahuila, Mexico
 Santa Rosa de Múzquiz, a city and seat of the municipality of Múzquiz
 Múzquiz metro station, a station on the Mexico City metro system
 Melchor Múzquiz (1790–1844), a Mexican soldier and politician
 Pedro Mendinueta y Múzquiz, (1736–1825), viceroy of New Granada
 Raymie Muzquiz (b. 1960), an American animation director